Balanus crenatus is a species of acorn barnacle in the Balanidae family. It is found in the North Pacific and the North Atlantic Ocean.

Description
The upper edge of the plates are toothed and the shell is often tilted to one side. The opercular aperture is diamond shaped and protected by two further plates which can slide across when the animal is not feeding.

Distribution
This is a boreal species distributed in intertidal and sublittoral zones of the North Pacific and the North Atlantic. It has a similar distribution to Balanus balanus, a species with which it is often associated.

Biology
This barnacle is a hermaphrodite and the reproductive organs develop during the winter. Individuals in a group fertilise each other and, after a period of maturation, nauplii are liberated into the water. After a number of moults, the larvae settle out of the zooplankton in about April and attach themselves to rocks and stones on the sea floor. It is fully grown by August and ready to reproduce in its first winter.

Ecology
This species is mainly found in the sublittoral zone but can sometimes be found under stones or overhangs on the lower shore. It colonises pebbles, bedrock, shells and artificial structures. It seems to favour habitats with strong currents and when overcrowding occurs, may be distorted to fit the space available. It is often found growing alongside another species of barnacle, Balanus balanus.

The main predator is the juvenile common starfish (Asterias rubens). Medium sized barnacles seem to be at greatest risk. Small specimens are ignored  while large specimens seem able to withstand attack but in some years, the population is decimated.

References

Barnacles
Crustaceans described in 1789